The Lombard Committee for Resolution 44 (Comitato Lombardo per la Risoluzione 44, CoLoR44) is a trans-party movement active in Lombardy, a region of Italy.

CoLoR44 proposes a referendum on the self-determination of Lombardy. The movement takes inspiration from a resolution, approved by the Regional Council of nearby Veneto in November 2012, which set the course toward a possible referendum on Venetian independence. The Committee is supported by several parties and associations, including Venetian Independence (the Venetian party which proposed Resolution 44) and Padanian Union.

References

External links
Official website

2013 establishments in Italy